John Houstoun (August 31, 1744 – July 20, 1796) was an American lawyer and statesman from Savannah, Georgia. He was one of the original Sons of Liberty and also a delegate for Georgia in the Second Continental Congress in 1775. He was the Governor of Georgia, in 1778, and again in 1784–1785.

Personal life
John was born to aristocratic Scots immigrants in St. George's Parish, near modern Waynesboro and the eastern border of Georgia. His parents were Sir Patrick (Baronet) and Priscilla (Dunbar) Houstoun. His father served as the registrar of land grants for the Georgia Colony and the collector of quit-rents (a permanent annual tax on each grant). John was educated in Savannah and read law there. He was admitted to the bar and started a law practice in Savannah.

Houstoun married Hannah Bryan, whose father Jonathan was a wealthy Savannah merchant. They built their home, White Bluff, about nine miles (14 km) northwest of Savannah. The couple had no children.

Revolutionary years
Houstoun was a successful lawyer, and was appointed to the Governor's Council by James Wright. But in 1774, Houstoun was one of the founders of the nascent revolutionary government in Georgia. He joined with Archibald Bulloch and others to form a Committee of Correspondence in support of the residents of Boston suffering the effects of the Boston Port Act. The committee went on to create formal protests against other measures brought about by the Intolerable Acts.

That same year, John was a representative in the rebel Provincial Congress of Georgia, and they named him as a delegate to the First Continental Congress. He declined, since fewer than half the counties were represented in the Provincial Congress. By 1775 this defect was remedied and he accepted that appointment. In Congress, he was a strong supporter of the movement toward independence, but resisted the non-importation agreements because of their negative effects on the southern colonies.

He was reappointed to the national congress in 1776, but did not attend. He stayed at home to work with the Committee of Safety to thwart the loyalist efforts of the popular preacher and loyalist, John Zubly. Early in 1778, he was elected as the second revolutionary Governor of Georgia also being the first governor of Georgia to be born in Georgia. That same year, he took charge of the Georgia militia in an abortive attempt to seize the British post of St. Augustine, Florida. His disagreements with the Continental Army commander, Robert Howe, contributed greatly to the failure of the expedition. When the British, in response, captured Savannah on December 29, Houstoun was forced into hiding.

Creek Indians raided plantations and carried slaves off from within a few miles of Savannah. The "daily depredations" of these raiding groups, Governor Houstoun wrote, "almost at our very Town-Gates, threaten us with certain ruin unless some remedy is applied."

Later career
After the surrender at Yorktown, the British abandoned Savannah in 1782. Houstoun returned home, taking a seat in the Georgia House of Representatives, where he briefly served as Speaker in 1783. He then was elected to another one-year term as governor in 1784.

Houstoun pushed for more access to the Indian Country. "Formerly when the people of Pensacola and Mobile were one and the same with Us, we did not carry on trade with you from this Country, and then there was no Occasion to ask a Path thro’ the Creek Nation." Since the Spanish controlled Florida, he wanted more east-west trade routes. The Creeks declined to grant the Choctaws access to the Georgia traders.

On September 28, 1784 Governor John Houstoun granted four 5000 acre tracts of vacant land in Franklin county, Georgia to French Vice Admiral d'Estaing and his heirs. The four bountyland grants totaling 20,000 acres were subsequently registered on June 13, 1785.

In 1790 he became the first elected Mayor of Savannah, and in 1791 was appointed a justice of the Superior Court of Georgia. After 1792 he served as president of the Chatham Academy.

Legacy

Houstoun died at his home, White Bluff, just outside Savannah on July 20, 1796. Houston County in central Georgia was named for him. The variation in spelling is typical of early nineteenth century orthography.

See also
List of speakers of the Georgia House of Representatives

References

Further reading
 Edith Duncan Johnston; "The Houstouns of Georgia"; 1950, University of Georgia Press

External links
 
 Timeline of John Houstoun's life
 "To Benjamin Franklin from John Houstoun, 17 March 1778," Founders Online, National Archives.
 Governor John Houston historical marker

1744 births
1796 deaths
Continental Congressmen from Georgia (U.S. state)
18th-century American politicians
Governors of Georgia (U.S. state)
Mayors of Savannah, Georgia
People from Burke County, Georgia
American people of Scottish descent
Independent state governors of the United States
Georgia (U.S. state) Independents
American lawyers admitted to the practice of law by reading law